Matthew Walker (born 11 April 1942) is an English-Canadian film and television actor best known for his role in Little Women.

Career
He appeared in many Canadian television productions in the 1990s and 2000s. He played Michael, Nick Eliot's boss in The Crush. He played Father Mac in 22 episodes of the television series Hope Island, and Max Asher in 11 episodes of MythQuest. He also played the recurring character Ian MacLeod, the father of Duncan MacLeod in Highlander: The Series, Father Perry in Mysterious Ways and Merlin in the Stargate television franchise. In 2007, he was nominated for a Leo Award for "Best Supporting Performance by a Male in a Dramatic Series" in the Stargate SG-1 episode "The Quest (Part 2)". He also played Mr March in Little Women.

Filmography

Film

Television

References

External links

1942 births
English male film actors
English male television actors
Canadian male film actors
Canadian male television actors
Canadian male voice actors
Living people
English emigrants to Canada
Canadian expatriates in England